Larbi Benboudaoud (born 5 March 1974 in Bordj Zemoura, Algeria) is a judoka from France, who won the silver medal in the half lightweight (– 66 kg) division at the 2000 Summer Olympics in Sydney, Australia. In the final he was defeated by Turkey's Huseyin Ozkan.

Achievements

References

External links
 
 
 
 Profile at L'Equipe 
 Video footage of Larbi Benboudaoud (judovision.org)

1974 births
Living people
French male judoka
Algerian emigrants to France
Judoka at the 1996 Summer Olympics
Judoka at the 2000 Summer Olympics
Judoka at the 2004 Summer Olympics
Olympic judoka of France
Olympic silver medalists for France
Olympic medalists in judo
World judo champions
Medalists at the 2000 Summer Olympics